Danila Olegovich Smirnov (born 7 June 2001) is a Russian football player. He plays as a central midfielder for Volgar Astrakhan.

Club career
He made his debut in the Russian Professional Football League for FC Krylia Sovetov-2 Samara on 13 October 2017 in a game against FC Volga Ulyanovsk.

He made his debut for the senior squad of PFC Krylia Sovetov Samara on 25 September 2019 in a Russian Cup game against FC Torpedo Moscow. He made his Russian Premier League debut for Krylia Sovetov on 4 July 2020 in a game against FC Rostov, replacing Dmitri Kabutov in the 80th minute.

Career statistics

References

External links
 
 
 Profile by Russian Professional Football League

2001 births
Sportspeople from Samara, Russia
Living people
Russian footballers
Association football midfielders
PFC Krylia Sovetov Samara players
FC Volgar Astrakhan players
Russian Premier League players
Russian First League players
Russian Second League players